Vasile Hossu (30 January 1866 – 13 January 1916) was a Romanian Greek Catholic hierarch. He was bishop of the Romanian Catholic Eparchy of Lugoj from 1903 to 1911 and the Romanian Catholic Eparchy of Gherla, Armenopoli, Szamos-Ujvár from 1911 to 1916.

Born in Neumarkt am Mieresch, Austrian Empire (present-day Târgu Mureș, Romania) in 1866, he was ordained a priest on 27 August 1888. He was appointed the Bishop by the Holy See on 25 June 1903. He was consecrated to the Episcopate on 21 September 1903. The principal consecrator was Archbishop Victor Mihaly de Apșa and co-consecrators were Bishop Ioan Sabo and Bishop Demetriu Radu.

He died in Budapest, Austria-Hungary on 13 January 1916.

References 

1866 births
1916 deaths
20th-century Eastern Catholic bishops
Romanian Greek-Catholic bishops